Romina Falconi (born 1 January 1985) is an Italian electropop singer-songwriter.

Biography

Early life and career
Romina Falconi grew up in Torpignattara (a known area of Rome), and made her debut on Teatro Ariston, at the 57th Sanremo Music Festival, in 2007, with "Ama", rising the fifth position in the Newcomers section. In 2009 she worked as choirgirl during Eros Ramazzotti's Ali e Radici World Tour.

In 2010 she moved in Milan, where she starts her collaboration with independent humoristic songwriter Immanuel Casto, with "Crash", an electropop/comedy single contained in Casto's album "Adult Music".

The X-Factor experience
In search for a renaissance, after an unproductive period, in 2012 she decided to take part in the sixth season of the Italian version of The X-Factor, membering the Over 25 category and mentored by Morgan. Her fashion stylist was Roberta Martini. She started a dadaist trip in the new wave genre, which was far from her tastes, performing songs like "Duel" by Propaganda, "The Voice" by Ultravox and "Rio" by Duran Duran. One of her most notable performance was "Llorando", famous theme from David Lynch's Mulholland Drive, and Roy Orbison's Crying cover. She went eliminated at the end of fourth live show, after a variation on trash genre, in which she revisited "Il tempo se ne va" by Adriano Celentano.

Independent works
After her experience in the showtime, in 2014 Falconi published her first independent Ep's, produced by JLe Management, named "Certi sogni si fanno", containing her most successful single, "Il mio prossimo amore". In the same year Falconi restart the collaboration with Immanuel Casto, airing new singles like "Sognando Cracovia" and "Eyeliner", ironic and grotesque ballads about greed, extreme sex and transgender people. While "Sognando Cracovia" is a taunting ballad joking about a double-dealer, polish carer and her customed old man, "Eyeliner" is the first Casto featuring in a song totally written by Romina, in which are included strong autobiographical contents, related to her youth and an important friendship with Giò, a transsexual woman. The videoclip is a sort of dreamlike and tragic suburb noir, inspired by T.S. Eliot.

Falconi's next EPs are named "Attraverso" and "Un filo d'odio". From these works went released singles "Attraverso" and "Maniaca", and videoclips for the same songs and "Eyeliner". Other videoclips went previously released also for "Sotto il cielo di Roma" and "Il mio prossimo amore", all directed by Luca Tartaglia.

During 2015 they made the Sognando Cracovia Tour. In the same year Falconi and Casto also tried to compete at Sanremo, introducing their song "Finché morte non ci separi", an outrageous collaboration with Conchita Wurst, but they went rejected by host Carlo Conti. The song was probably considered too much eccentric and irritating to be included into a neomelodic competition.

On 16 October 2015 Falconi aired the video clip for "Playboy", one of the five unreleased tracks for her debut album, which recollect her three 2014 EPs: "Certi sogni si fanno attraverso un filo d'odio", announced for 6 November. On 30 October Falconi published the first single from the album, "Anima", the first Romina's radio promoted song.

In June 2016 Falconi and Casto aired their fifth collaboration, the Gay Village official theme, "Who is afraid of Gender?", for the first time with English lyrics. The song is an invitation to express themselves, while the official video is a choreographical carnival includes guest appearances by Vladimir Luxuria and Eva Grimaldi, with scorns to Mario Adinolfi and Sentinelle In Piedi (literally Stand Up Sentinels), two of the most popular homophobic proponent in Italy.

Other works

In 2015 Falconi makes a featuring in Bikinirama's debut album's song Non ti sento, with Federico Zampaglione.

In 2016 she takes part at the web show Citofonare Passoni, conducted by Diego Passoni. In the same year she performs Maga Romina in Piero Chiambretti's Grand Hotel Chiambretti. In may she hosts the second edition of Cromatica, a three days long queer festival, with performances offered by many italians lgbtq chorus, including actress Lella Costa as guest.

Discography

Albums

Extended plays/Singles

Other appearances in compilation albums

Featuring

References

External links 
 Romina Falconi Official Site

Sanremo Music Festival
X Factor (Italian TV series) contestants
1985 births
Living people
21st-century Italian singers